Ear-Piercing Punk is a compilation album issued in both LP and CD formats of obscure 1960s garage rock that was originally released on AIP Records in the late 1970s. As discussed on the AIP Records website and in reviews of the album during its initial release, the album was given the name "Ear-Piercing Punk" to try to market or turn this music, now often referred to as proto punk, on to kids just getting into punk rock for the first time as a result of the 1970s punk explosion. The purpose of the album was to show that punk had existed for quite a number of years prior to the generally accepted mainstream use of the term to define bands such as the Ramones, Sex Pistols and The Clash.

Track listing

LP
Side 1:
 "I'm a Hog for You" – The Groupies
 "Ubangi Stomp" – The Trashmen
 "Rebel Woman" – Dean Carter
 "Nonstop Blues" – Outlaw Blues
 "Bottle Up and Go" – Mile Ends
 "I Feel Like Crying" – Sound Extraction
 "Enough" – Bohemian Vendetta
 "Jailhouse Rock" – Dean Carter

Side 2:
 "No Friend of Mine" – The Sparkles
 "Don't Crowd Me" – Keith Kessler
 "Mister, You're a Better Man Than I" – The Herde
 "Runnin' Thru the Night" – Mistic Tide
 "(Your Love Is Like a) Magnet" – Age of Reason
 "Little Black Egg" – The Kommotions
 "She Ain't No Use to Me" – The Ugly Ducklings
 "I Need Love" – The Third Booth

CD
 "I'm a Hog for You" - The Groupies
 "Nonstop Blues" - Outlaw Blues
 "Bottle Up and Go" - Mile Ends
 "I Feel Like Crying" - Sound Extraction
 "Enough" - Bohemian Vendetta
 "Don't Crowd Me" - Keith Kessler
 "Magnet" - Age of Reason
 "Little Black Egg" - The Kommotions
 "She Ain't No Use to Me" - The Ugly Ducklings
 "Primitive" - The Groupies
 "Growth" - The Guys Who Came up from Downstairs
 "I Can Only Give You Everything" - Bram Rigg Set
 "Train Kept A-Rollin'" - Precious Few
 "Psychedelic Retraction" - Creations Disciple
 "Gotta Hear the Beat" - Animal Jack
 "Down the Road Apiece" - Color
 "Young Miss Larsen" - Color
 "Just If She's There" - Dennis & The Times
 "You Better Stop" - Maltese
 "No More" - Oscar Five

See also
List of garage rock bands
Garage rock
Nuggets (series)
Pebbles (series)
Back from the Grave (series)

Notes and references

Pebbles (series) albums
1979 compilation albums
Punk rock compilation albums
Garage rock compilation albums